Przybyła is a surname of Polish language origin, derived from the verb przybyć (to arrive), "the one who had arrived". Notable people with this surname include:
Józef Przybyła (1945-2009), Polish ski-jumper
Michał Przybyła (born 1994), Polish footballer

See also
Joel Przybilla

Polish-language surnames